This is a listing of the Full Metal Panic! light novel books, as well as the anime productions and manga based upon it.

List of novels

List of manga

Soundtracks

Full Metal Panic!

Opening and ending theme
Performed by Mikuni Shimokawa, collected on the single album, tomorrow / 枯れない花 published by Pony Canyon.

ASIN:B00005V1M7

Full Metal Panic OST 1

Composed by Toshihiko Sahashi. JAN:4988013324008.

Full Metal Panic OST 2

Composed by Toshihiko Sahashi. JAN:4988013358409.

Full Metal Panic? Fumoffu

Opening and ending theme
Performed by Mikuni Shimokawa, collected on the single album, それが、愛でしょう/君に吹く風 published by Pony Canyon.

ASIN: B0000A8UZQ

Full Metal Panic? Fumoffu OST

Composed by Toshihiko Sahashi. フルメタル・パニック?ふもっふサウンドトラックアルバム by Pony Canyon Records. 
ASIN: B0000DJWDG

Full Metal Panic! The Second Raid

Opening and ending theme
Performed by Mikuni Shimokawa, collected on the single album, 南風 / もう一度君に会いたい published by Pony Canyon.

ASIN:B000A0H4RC

Full Metal Panic TSR OST

Non-Japanese releases
Europe: ADV Films UK released the series on DVD in Europe in at least two versions, one of them being Scandinavian.Klub Publishing released the first two series on DVD in Hungary.

Toys

Human figures
The series has many figures of the various characters. Atelier Sai has produced a blind-box set based on Fumoffu's female characters-a set with guns, and a set from the hot spring. 1/6 and 1/8 scale figures of Tessa and Kaname are available, some of which have removable clothing.

Arm Slaves
The series has various action figures of the Arm Slaves. Alter and Aoshima produced 1/48 and 1/35 scale figures of Kurz and Mao's Gernsbacks, the Arbalest and an RK-92 Savage. Kaiyodo introduced the Arbalest and Laevatein into their Revoltech line in 2007 and 2008. In August 2011, Revoltech re-released the Laevatein in a much bigger package which includes the XL-3 flight pack as well.
Bandai took it a step further in 2009 by including the Arm Slaves as part of the company's Robot Damashii (Robot Spirits) line-up, starting with the Arbalest in September 2009. Since then, the firm produced replicas of Kurz and Mao's Gernsbacks, the Falke, desert and urban versions of the Savage AS, the standard and Combat variations of Sousuke's Bonta-kun, the ARX-8 Laevatein, the Codarl, a recolored Arbalest with Lambda Driver flame-effect parts, and Leonard Testarossa's Belial. The XL-2 Emergency jetpack, the mass-produced Combat Bonta-kun (a gray-skinned soldier version that appeared in the Fumoffu episode Fancy without Honor or Humanity), a blue-and-white Savage that appeared in the novel Burning One-Man Force, the XL-3 flight pack, Gates and Gauron's Venom, the mass-produced Codarl, their weapon set, and a flight pack designed for the Arbalest Lambda Driver  are limited-edition online exclusives, with a sniper version of the Zy-99m Shadow slated for March 2014. Hobby Japan offered the Hiroshi Squadron Gernsback (desert versions featured in the first season's Wind Blows at Home storyarc) as a mail-order exclusive in its issues from March to April 2010. Dengeki Hobby followed suit with a weapon set  and a recolored Arbalest that appeared in the first-season episode Venom's Fire (which also had the weapons set bundled in).

For Full Metal Panic! Another, Robot Spirits figures have been produced of the AS-1 Blaze Raven, Fumiko Sanjo's Rk-02 Sceptre, and a DOMS special Zy-99m Shadow (online exclusive). A red version of the Blaze Raven is bundled with the fifth novel volume and a heavy weapons version of the Rk-02 belonging to Sanjo's brother Akira were released in 2013.

References

Anime soundtracks
Full Metal Panic!
Film and television discographies
Discographies of Japanese artists
Full Metal Panic
Mass media by franchise